Carpenters Corner, Delaware is a village two miles south of Lewes and four miles northwest of Rehoboth Beach in Sussex County, at . The village is located on Delaware Route 1, and is named for two prosperous dairy farmers.

References

Unincorporated communities in Sussex County, Delaware
Unincorporated communities in Delaware